Pokrovskoye-Streshnevo District  is an administrative district (raion) of North-Western Administrative Okrug, and one of the 125 raions of Moscow, Russia.

See also
Administrative divisions of Moscow

References

Notes

Sources

Districts of Moscow
North-Western Administrative Okrug